Juan José Suárez Coppel is a Mexican economist. He was a director-general of PEMEX, the state-owned government-granted monopoly in Mexico's petroleum industry. He is of Spanish ancestry.

History

Coppel is a graduate of the Instituto Tecnológico Autónomo de México in Mexico City, and earned his Ph.D. in economics from the University of Chicago.

He has taught economics at several leading universities in Mexico, Europe and at Brown University the United States.

External links

References

Mexican businesspeople in the oil industry
Pemex
Mexican economists
1972 births
Living people
Chief financial officers
Mexican chief executives
Brown University faculty
Academic staff of the Instituto Tecnológico Autónomo de México
Instituto Tecnológico Autónomo de México alumni
University of Chicago alumni
20th-century Mexican businesspeople
21st-century Mexican businesspeople